Horsfieldia grandis is a species of plant in the family Myristicaceae. It is found in Indonesia, Malaysia, and Singapore.

References

grandis
Least concern plants
Flora of Malesia
Taxonomy articles created by Polbot
Plants described in 1897